Chauhan Victoria Vada  is a food stall located in the Camac Street Vardaan Market in the city of Kolkata. The stall was started by Badrinath Chauhan in 1950, who came from the Jaunpur district in Uttar Pradesh and after  him his son Rajendra prasad chauhan   manage this  .It is currently running by his grandsons, Krishna , Pankaj and Anurag  Chauhan. Before coming to this location, the stall was located in the front of the Victoria Memorial.

They are known for their Victoria Vada, a snack similar to Rajasthani daal ka vada. It was a popular snack among British residents during the post colonial period. In 2013, British Prime Minister David Cameron visited the stall to sample this dish.

References

Tourist attractions in Kolkata
Restaurants in Kolkata
Culture of Kolkata